Jérémie Patrier-Leitus (born 7 March 1989) is a French politician. He served as a Deputy in the National Assembly for Calvados's 3rd constituency.

References

1989 births
Living people
Politicians from Normandy
Deputies of the 16th National Assembly of the French Fifth Republic
Paris Dauphine University alumni
Horizons politicians